Batanes, officially the Province of Batanes (Ilocano: Probinsia ti Batanes;), is an archipelagic province in the Philippines, administratively part of the Cagayan Valley region. It is the northernmost province in the country, and also the smallest, both in population and land area. The capital is Basco, located on the island of Batan.

The entire province is listed in the UNESCO tentative list for inscription in the World Heritage List. The government has been finalizing the site's inscription, establishing museums and conservation programs since 2001. Seven intangible heritage elements of the Ivatan have been set by the Philippine government in its initial inventory in 2012. The elements are undergoing a process to be included in the UNESCO Intangible Cultural Heritage Lists.

Etymology
The name Batanes is a hispanicised plural form derived from the Ivatan endonym Batan.

History

The ancestors of today's Ivatans descended from Austronesians who migrated to the islands 4,000 years ago during the Neolithic period. They lived in fortified mountain areas called idjangs and drank sugar-cane wine, or palek. They also used gold as currency and produced a thriving agriculture-based industry. They were also seafarers and boat-builders. Batanes was a major site for the Maritime Jade Road, one of the most extensive sea-based trade networks of a single geological material in the prehistoric world, operating for 3,000 years from 2000 BCE to 1000 CE.

In 1687, a crew of English freebooters headed by explorer, pirate, and naturalist William Dampier came with a Dutch crew and named the islands in honour of their country's nobility. Itbayat was named "Orange Isle" after William of Orange, and Batan was named "Grafton Isle" after Henry FitzRoy, 1st Duke of Grafton. Sabtang Isle was named "Monmouth Isle" after James Scott, 1st Duke of Monmouth. Capt. Dampier stayed for less than three months, and did not claim the islands for the British crown.

In 1783, the Spanish claimed Batanes as part of the Philippines under the auspices of Governor-General José Basco y Vargas; Batanes was ruled under Provincia de Cagayan. The Bashi Channel was increasingly used by English East India Company ships and the Spanish authorities brought the islands under their direct administration to prevent them falling under British control. The Ivatan remained on their idjang castle-fortresses for some time. In 1790, Governor Guerrero  decreed that Ivatans were to live in the lowlands and leave their remote idjang. The mangpus, or indigenous Ivatan leaders, headed by the Ivatan hero Aman Dangat, revolted against the Spanish invaders. Using guns, the Spanish ended the revolution, killing various Ivatan leaders, which included the murder of Aman Dangat. Basco and Ivana were the first towns established under full Spanish control. Mahatao was then administered by Basco, while Uyugan and Sabtang, by Ivana. Itbayat was not organized until the 1850s, its coast being a ridge. Soon, Ilocanos came to the islands and integrated with the local population. Roads, ports, bridges, churches and government buildings were built in this time. Limestone technology used by the Spanish was also spread to the islands, making bridges strong and fortified. Some of these bridges still remain at Ivana and Mahatao. By 1890, many Ivatans were in Manila, and became ilustrados, who then brought home with them the revolutionary ideas of the Katipunan. These Ivatans, who were then discontented with Spanish rule, killed the ruling General Fortea and declared the end of Spanish rule.

Toward the end of the Spanish administration, Batanes was made a part of Cagayan. In 1909, the new American authorities organized it into an independent province. During the American colonial period, additional public schools were constructed and more Ivatan became aware of their place in the Philippines. In 1920, the first wireless telegraph was installed, followed by an airfield in 1930. New roads were constructed and the Batanes High School was instituted.

Because of their strategic location, the islands was one of the first points occupied by invading Japanese imperial forces at the outbreak of the Pacific War. The morning of December 8, 1941, the Batan Task Force from Taiwan landed on the Batan Islands, which became the first American territory occupied by the Japanese. The purpose of the invasion was to secure the existing small airfield outside Basco, which was accomplished without resistance. Japanese fighters from Basco took part in the raid on Clark Air Base the following day. However, over the next several days, the success of the Japanese bombing of Clark Field rendered a base at Basco unnecessary, and on December 10, 1941, the naval combat force was withdrawn to participate in the invasion of Camiguin.

One of the first School Superintendents on Batan was Victor de Padua, an Ilocano, who in 1942–45 during the Japanese occupation was made Provincial Governor. Early in 1945 the island was liberated by the Philippine Commonwealth forces of the 1st and 12th Infantry Division of the Philippine Commonwealth Army. In 1984, Pacita Abad, the foremost Ivatan visual artist, became the first woman to be awarded the Ten Outstanding Young Men (TOYM) award, breaking 25 years of male dominance. In her acceptance speech, she said, "it was long overdue that Filipina women were recognized, as the Philippines was full of outstanding women" and referred proudly to her mother.

In 1993, the Batanes Protected Landscape and Seascape, which encompassed the entire province, was listed in the Tentative List of the Philippines for UNESCO World Heritage Site inscription in the future. In 1997, the Indigenous Peoples Rights act or IPRA was passed in Philippine Congress. The law paved the way for the indigenous territorial rights of the Ivatans. The province has since promoted its Ivatan roots. Part of the Ilocano population has returned to mainland Luzon. On December 7, 2004, Pacita Abad died after finishing her last international art work while suffering from cancer.

Geography

The province has a total area of  comprising ten islands situated within the Luzon Strait between the Balintang Channel and Taiwan. The islands are sparsely populated and subject to frequent typhoons. The three largest islands, Batan, Itbayat, and Sabtang, are the only inhabited islands.

The northernmost island in the province, also the northernmost land in the entire Philippines, is Mavulis (or Y'ami) Island. Other islands in the chain are Misanga (or North), Ditarem, Siayan, Diogo (or Dinem), Ivuhos, and Dequey. The islands are part of the Luzon Volcanic Arc.

Topography

Almost one-half of Batanes is hills and mountains. Batan Island is generally mountainous on the north and southeast. It has a basin in the interior. Itbayat Island slopes gradually to the west, being mountainous and hilly along its northern, eastern coast. As for Sabtang, mountains cover the central part, making the island slope outward to the coast.

The islands are situated between the vast expanse of the waters of Bashi Channel and Balintang Channel, where the Pacific Ocean merges with the China Sea. The area is a sea lane between the Philippines and Japan, China, Hong Kong and Taiwan. It is rich with marine resources, including the rarest sea corals in the world.

The province is hilly and mountainous, with only 1,631.5 hectares or 7.1% of its area level to undulating, and 78.2% or 17,994.4 hectares varying from rolling to steep and very steep. Forty-two percent (42%) or 9,734.40 hectares are steep to very steep land. Because of the terrain of the province, drainage is good and prolonged flooding is non-existent. The main island of Batan has the largest share of level and nearly level lands, followed by Itbayat and Sabtang, respectively. Sabtang has its small flat areas spread sporadically on its coasts, while its interior is dominated by steep mountains and deep canyons. Batan Island and Sabtang have intermittent stretches of sandy beaches and rocky shorelines.

The terrain of the province, while picturesque at almost every turn, has limited the potential for expansion of agriculture in an already very small province.

Climate
Batanes has a tropical climate (Köppen climate classification Am). Precipitation is abundant throughout the year; the rainiest month is August while the driest month is April. November to February are the coldest months. There is a misconception that Batanes is constantly battered by typhoons. Batanes is mentioned frequently in connection with typhoons, because it holds the northernmost weather station in the Philippines, thus, it is also a reference point for all typhoons that enter the Philippine area; however, in September 2016, Typhoon Meranti impacted the entire province, including a landfall on Itbayat.

Administrative divisions
Batanes is subdivided into 6 municipalities, all encompassed by a lone congressional district.

Barangays
The 6 municipalities of the province comprise a total of 29 barangays, with Ihuvok II in Basco as the most populous in 2010, and Nakanmuan in Sabtang as the least.

Demographics

The natives are called Ivatans and share prehistoric cultural and linguistic commonalities with the Babuyan on Babuyan Island and the Tao people of Orchid Island.

This divided homeland is a result of the Dutch invasion of Taiwan in 1624 (Dutch Formosa) and Spanish invasion in 1626 (Spanish Formosa). The northern half of the Ivatan homeland, Formosa and Orchid Island which were formally part of the Viceroyalty of New Spain, fell to the Dutch who were in turn expelled in 1662 by forces of the Chinese Southern Ming dynasty, led by the Chinese pirate Koxinga who then set himself up as The King of Taiwan.

The southern half of the Ivatan homeland, the islands of Batanes, was reinforced and fortified by Spanish refugees from Formosa before being formally joined in the 18th century with the Spanish government in Manila.

Ilocano minority population also lives in Batanes, but part of them left and returned to mainland Luzon.

The main languages spoken in Batanes are Ivatan, which is spoken on the islands of Batan and Sabtang; Itbayaten, which is spoken primarily on the island of Itbayat. The Ivatan which is dominant in the province is considered to be one of the Austronesian languages. From college level down to elementary level, the language is widely spoken. The  Ivatans widely speak and understand the Ilocano (lingua franca of northern Luzon), Tagalog, and English languages.

Batanes Ilocanos are bilingual in Ilocano and Ivatan, they already speak Ilocano with Ivatan accent.

Religion
The large majority (94%) of the island's people adhere to Roman Catholicism. The remaining faiths are other Christian Churches.

Ecology

An extensive survey of the ecology of Batanes provided the scientific basis for confirming the need for a national park in Batanes protecting the Batanes protected landscapes and seascapes, proposed as a UNESCO World Heritage Site, submitted on August 15, 1993. An effort is underway to declare the whole province, along with the sugar central sites in Negros, as a UNESCO World Heritage Site.

Flora and fauna
The province is the home of the unique conifer species Podocarpus costalis. Although it is reportedly growing in some other places such as coasts of Luzon, Catanduanes and even Taiwan, full blossoming and fruiting are observed only in Batanes. Its fruiting capacity on the island remains a mystery but is likely due to several factors such as climate, soil and type of substratum of the island.

Several species of birds, bats, reptiles and amphibians also inhabit the island; many of those are endemic to the Philippines. The island is also a sanctuary of different migratory birds during winter in the Northern Hemisphere.

Economy

About 75% of the Ivatans are farmers and fishermen. The rest are employed in the government and services sector. Garlic and cattle are major cash crops. Ivatans also plant camote (sweet potato), cassava, gabi or tuber and a unique variety of white uvi. Sugarcane is raised to produce palek, a kind of native wine, and vinegar.

In recent years, fish catch has declined due to the absence of technical know-how. Employment opportunities are scarce. Most of the educated Ivatans have migrated to urban centers or have gone abroad.

A wind diesel generating plant was commissioned in 2004.

Distance and bad weather work against its economic growth. Certain commodities like rice, soft drinks, and gasoline carry a 75% to 100% mark-up over Manila retail prices.

Transportation
The island province of Batanes is accessible by air via the Basco Airport and Itbayat Airport. There are 3 flights per week from Manila by SkyJetAir, and from Tuguegarao (Cagayan) by small local airliners (as of January 2013). PAL Express flies to Batanes every Monday, Wednesday, and Friday since May 1, 2013.

Values
The Ivatan people of Batanes are one of the most egalitarian societies in the Philippines. The prime motivator of the cultural values of the Ivatans are imbibed in their pre-colonial belief systems of respecting nature and all people. The Ivatans, both the older and younger generations, have one of the highest incidences of social acceptance to minority groups in the country. The Ivatans also have a high respect for the elderly and the prowess of natural phenomena such as waves, sea breeze, lightning, thunders, earthquakes, and wildlife congregations. Discriminating someone based on skin color, ethnic origin, sexual orientation, gender identity, age, and traditions on nature is unacceptable in Ivatan values. Land grabbing is also a grave crime in Ivatan societies, making ancestral domain certification an important part of Ivatan jurisprudence since the enactment of the IPRA Law.

Heritage

Natural

 Sabtang Island is undisturbed and unspoiled. It has intermittent white sand beaches with steep mountains and deep canyons with small level areas sporadically found along the coastline. Southwest of Batan Island, Sabtang is accessible by 30-minute falowa ride from Radiwan Port in Ivana. Sabtang Island is also the take-off point for Ivuhos Island from Barangay Nakanmuan.
 Itbayat Island is located north of Batan Island. Itbayat is shaped like a giant bowl. It has a dirt airstrip for light aircraft. A regular ferry runs the Batan-Itbayat route. Travel time is about four hours by falowa from Basco Seaport. A light plane flies from Basco Airport to Itbayat at around P1,875 per person and leaves only when the plane is full.
 Batan Island is the most populated island of the province. It is composed of four municipalities: Basco, Ivana, Uyugan, and Mahatao. Basco is the center of commerce and the seat of the provincial government.
 Mount Iraya is a dormant volcano standing at  whose last eruption was recorded in 505 AD. Mountaineering, trekking, and trailblazing are recommended sports activities on the mountain. Walking distance from Basco, the top of Mt. Iraya can be reached in about three hours.
 Mavulis Island is the northernmost island of Batanes. From this location, one can see Formosa (Taiwan) on a clear day. Tatus or coconut crabs abound on the island surrounded by rich marine life.
 Di-atay Beach is a cove with multi-colored rocks and white sand ideal for picnics and beachcombing.
 Songsong in Chadpidan Bay is an hour of exhilarating trek from Basco proper. It is famous for its beautiful sunset view.
 Naidi Hills is walking distance from Basco.
 Chawa Cave is for the more adventurous. An enchanted cave with a natural salt bed whose mouth opens to the south China Sea and is accessible through the boulders of Chawa Point in Mahatao.
 Sitio Diura at Racuj-a-Ide is the fishermen's village at Mananoy Bay. Fishing season is marked by a festival in mid-March called Kapayvanuvanua. Visitors are treated with fresh fish delicacies from the Pacific Ocean. Within the area is the legendary Spring of Youth and living cave with crystal limestone formations.
 Mt. Matarem is an extinct volcano  at its summit.
 White Beach at Vatang, Hapnit, and Mavatuy Point, all in Mahatao.
 Storm-proof Stone houses in Batanes many residents during typhoon made up their already-fortified houses with wood and secured the roofs with nets and ropes. This was done to ensure that the structures—which symbolize the Ivatan's strength and resilience against disasters—outlast the high-pressure winds of a typhoon that is expected to unleash. Tapangkos or covering were also installed on the doors and windows of several buildings in Batanes, including the capitol building. During heavy storms, it was also a time for Bayanihan of the residents as they helped each other tie-down roofs.

Man-made

 Radar Tukon was a United States weather station on a hilltop. It offers a magnificent 360-degree view of Batan Island, the South China Sea, Mt. Iraya, Basco proper, boulder lined cliffs and the Pacific Ocean. At present, it houses the northernmost weather station in the Philippines, the Basco Radar Station, and is only  from Basco.
 Ruins Of Songsong is a ghost barangay which is a cluster of roofless shells of old stone houses abandoned after a tidal wave that hit the island of Batan in the 1950s. It has a long stretch of beach.
 San Jose Church in Ivana was built in 1814. It has a crenelated fortress-like campanile.
 Kanyuyan Beach & Port at Baluarte Bay in Basco is the port of call of the cargo ships bringing goods from Manila.
It was completed in 1789 and still retains its centuries-old features.
 Idjangs or fortified stone fortresses where the native Ivatans' ancestors migrated to Batanes as early as 4,000 BC lived in them for defensive cover.
 Fundacion Pacita is a lodging house and restaurant, which was formerly owned by Pacita Abad, the most iconic Ivatan visual artist. The house has been redecorated and filled with numerous art works of Pacita Abad after she died in 2004.

Historical

 Radiwan Point at Ivana Seaport is where the Katipuneros landed on September 18, 1898. It is also the ferry station of the falowas plying the islands of Sabtang and Itbayat.
 Boat-shaped Stone Grave Markers, Chuhangin Burial Site, Ivuhos Island, Sabtang, Batanes
 Chavulan Burial Jar Site, Ivuhos Island, Sabtang Island
 Arrangement of Stone with Holes, Sumnanga, Sabtang
 Columnar Stones, Post Holes, Stone Anchors, Itbud Idyang, Uyugan, Batanes
 Arrangement of Stone Walls, Idyang Site, Basco, Batanes
 Paso Stone Formation, Ivuhos Island, Sabtang, Batanes
 Columnar Stone with Holes, Mahatao, Batanes

Intangible Heritage
In 2012, the National Commission for Culture and the Arts (NCCA) and the ICHCAP of UNESCO published Pinagmulan: Enumeration from the Philippine Inventory of Intangible Cultural Heritage. The first edition of the UNESCO-backed book included (1) Laji, (2) Kapayvanuvanuwa Fishing Ritual, (3) Kapangdeng Ritual, (4) Traditional Boats in Batanes, (5) Sinadumparan Ivatan House Types, (6) Ivatan Basketry, and (7) Ivatan (Salakot) Hat Weaving, signifying their great importance to Philippine intangible cultural heritage. The local government of Batanes, in cooperation with the NCCA, is given the right to nominate the 7 distinct elements into the UNESCO Intangible Cultural Heritage Lists.

Gallery

References

External links

 
 
 
 Batanes Islands Cultural Atlas
 Northern Luzon cultures
 Batanes Travel and Tours
 Batanes Budget Travel Guide
 TRAVEL TIP: A Guide on Planning a Trip to Batanes

 
Provinces of the Philippines
Provinces of Cagayan Valley
Island provinces of the Philippines
Islands of Luzon
Protected landscapes and seascapes of the Philippines
States and territories established in 1909
1909 establishments in the Philippines
World Heritage Tentative List for the Philippines
Former sub-provinces of the Philippines